The Australian League may refer to:

Sports
 The A-League - the top level of association football in Australia and New Zealand
 The Australian Football League the top level of Australian Rules Football in Australia

Politics
 The Australian League of Rights is an Australian political movement.